Cricket in Botswana was started by expatriates from South Africa and Indian Subcontinent. The team won the Pepsi ICC Africa World Cricket League in 2008.

History
Cricket was started in Botswana by expatriates from South Africa and the Indian subcontinent. It has started to make strides in the game since becoming an Associate Member of the ICC  in 2005.

Performance
Its success in the Pepsi ICC Africa World Cricket League - runners up in 2006 and winners in 2008 - has paved the way to the international stage.

It has not found life easy since its elevation, however, being relegated from ICC World Cricket League Division Five and Six in successive years, meaning its next participation will be in World Cricket League Division Seven in March–April 2011.

See also 
 Sports in Botswana
 Botswana cricket team